"Holy Roller" is a term used to describe Christian denominations in the Wesleyan-Holiness movement.

Holy Roller or Holy Rollers may also refer to:

Film 
 Holy Rollers (film), a 2010 American film starring Jesse Eisenberg
 Holy Rollers, a fictional roller derby team in the 2009 film Whip It

Music 
 Holy Roller (album), a 1999 album by Reverend Horton Heat 
 "Holy Roller", a song by Mother Love Bone from Apple
 "Holy Roller", a song by Nazareth from Greatest Hits
 "Holy Roller", a song by Throwdown from Venom & Tears
 "Holy Roller [Hallelujah]", a song by Portugal. The Man from Evil Friends
 Holy Rollers, an early '90s Dischord Records punk band
 "Holy Roller", a 2020 song by Spiritbox on the album Eternal Blue

Sports 
 Holy Roller (American football), a play in a 1978 game between the San Diego Chargers and the Oakland Raiders
 Holy Roller (horse) (foaled 1992), an Australian Thoroughbred racehorse

Other 
 Holy Roller (tank), one of two Canadian tanks that fought from D-Day to VE Day
 Holy Rollers N.Y.B., a club in the annual New Year's Day Mummers Parade in Philadelphia, Pennsylvania
 Holy Rollerz, an American Christian automotive ministry